Maurice Allan (born 30 October 1945) is a British wrestler. He competed in the men's freestyle 90 kg at the 1976 Summer Olympics. In 1974, Allan won bronze in freestyle wrestling at the European Commonwealth Games. Also during 1974, Allan demonstrated himself to be a world class competitor in Sambo.  In Madrid, Allan took bronze at the 1974 edition of the European Sambo Championships.  The following year, in Minsk, Allan became world champion by winning gold at the 1975 World Sambo Championships. In 1975, he was made an MBE.

References

External links
 

1945 births
Living people
British male sport wrestlers
Olympic wrestlers of Great Britain
Wrestlers at the 1976 Summer Olympics
British sambo practitioners
Sportspeople from Edinburgh
Commonwealth Games bronze medallists for Scotland
Commonwealth Games medallists in wrestling
Wrestlers at the 1974 British Commonwealth Games
Medallists at the 1974 British Commonwealth Games